Raj Bhavan, Maharashtra may refer to:

 Raj Bhavan, Mahabaleshwar, official residence of the governor of Maharashtra, located in Mahabaleshwar
 Raj Bhavan, Mumbai, official residence of the governor of Maharashtra, located in Mumbai
 Raj Bhavan, Nagpur, official residence of the governor of Maharashtra, located in Nagpur
 Raj Bhavan, Pune, official residence of the governor of Maharashtra, located in Pune
 Governor of Maharashtra, as the office